Forum for Democracy (FVD) is a right-wing populist Eurosceptic political party in the Netherlands that was founded as a think tank by Thierry Baudet and Henk Otten in 2016. The party first participated in elections in the 2017 general election, winning two seats in the House of Representatives. In the 2019 provincial elections, it won the most seats out of any party, although 61 out of 86 representatives have since defected. 

At the time of its conception the FVD was considered a conservative liberal and a eurosceptic movement positioned on the right-wing of the political spectrum, but after several founding members split from the party it has been described as adopting more radical policies and messages.

History 
FVD was established by Baudet and Otten as a citizens initiative and then a think tank whose main feat was campaigning in the 2016 Dutch Ukraine–European Union Association Agreement referendum and against the EU in general. The think-tank argued for the introduction of a referendum act and campaigned with GeenPeil to have an inquiry into Dutch membership of the eurozone.

In September 2016, it converted itself into a political party and announced its intention to take part in the 2017 general election, where the FvD ended up with 1.8% of the vote and 2 seats, entering parliament for the first time. In February 2019, the FvD had nearly 31,000 members.

In February 2018, in part due to its fast growing pace the party suffered from internal issues with a number of prominent members leaving the party because they felt the party had a lack of internal democracy.

Electoral breakthrough
In the 2018 municipal elections, the FvD won three seats on the Amsterdam city council. The party only stood in Amsterdam. In Rotterdam however it endorsed the Livable Rotterdam party.
During the 2019 provincial elections, Forum for Democracy won 86 seats, spread across the twelve provinces of the Netherlands. In South Holland, North Holland, and Flevoland, FvD became the largest party, winning 11, 9 and 8 seats respectively. In all other provinces, the party came either second or third in terms of numbers of votes. As populists, the bulk of the Forum's nominated parliamentary candidates did not have prior active experience in other political parties.

On 30 April 2020, Forum for Democracy formed a coalition with the Christian Democratic Appeal (CDA) in the North Brabant province, the first time the party had formally entered into the administration of a regional authority. In late 2020, former VVD MP Wybren van Haga defected to the party. Van Haga left FVD six months after that.

Splits

In April and November 2020, the party became split following a series of controversies related to members of the FvD's youth wing making comments that were deemed to contain racism and homophobia. Baudet was also accused of endorsing antisemitic conspiracies, something he denied. This led to calls for Baudet to be removed as FvD leader and he temporarily stepped down. In December 2020, it was announced that Baudet had returned as party leader and would lead the FvD into the 2021 Dutch general election.

At the 2021 general election, the party campaigned against COVID-19 lockdown measures imposed by the Dutch government and managed to win eight MPs. However, the issue of racist comments from youth members was brought up again during the campaign. One of the accused youth members, Gideon van Meijeren, was elected into parliament, as was youth wing chairman Freek Jansen.

In May 2021, three of the FvD MPs (Van Haga, Hans Smolders and Olaf Ephraim) left the party to sit as independents in response to the FvD releasing a poster comparing the lockdown to the Nazi occupation of the Netherlands.

In 2022, the FvD regained representation in the European Parliament when Marcel de Graaff defected to the party. As a result, the FvD became a member of the Identity and Democracy group instead of the European Conservatives and Reformists (ECR). In 2022 FvD left the European Conservatives and Reformists Party. In March 2022, Senators Theo Hiddema and Paul Frentrop left the party over FvD's absence at Ukrainian President Volodymyr Zelenskyy's speech to the House of Representatives, leaving only Senator Johan Dessing.

Ideology and political positions 
At the time of its foundation in 2016 the FvD was initially described as a national conservative and a conservative liberal political party. The party self-identified as liberal conservative and sat on the right-wing of the political spectrum.

After establishing itself, the party and its platform started to be perceived by political commentators as a standard Eurosceptic national populist political party, and on the far-right of the spectrum. It was also accused of drawing links with the alt-right movement. The FvD has been described as ideologically national conservative,  Hard Eurosceptic, and right-wing populist. On its official platform, the FvD declares itself to be a movement rather than a party with a focus on protecting Dutch sovereignty, identity, and cultural and intellectual property. The party wants stricter immigration and integration policies, calling for the protection of high culture and "Judeo-Christian values". The FvD is also opposed to the integration of the European Union which it claims will lead to eventual Eurofederalism and supports a referendum on Dutch membership of EU. In the Dutch newspaper Het Financieele Dagblad, historian and philosopher Jozef Waanders has described the FvD as containing various factions, including members sympathetic to the ideas of Ayn Rand and Michel Houellebecq. The FvD has also been described as one of several contemporary conservative-populist parties in the Netherlands that have been inspired by or inherited the mantle of the defunct Pim Fortuyn List.

The party initially focused on drawing support from former People's Party for Freedom and Democracy (VVD) voters who felt the VVD had grown too soft on the policy areas of European Union and immigration, but saw the Party for Freedom as too hardline, and tried recruiting candidates who came from professional rather than political backgrounds. The FvD has been accused of cultivating popularity among the alt-right movement, although the party does not identify itself as such.

In the European parliament, the FvD sat with the European Conservatives and Reformists until a split in the party in 2020, when its former MEP's defected to JA21 party and joined European Conservatives and Reformists Party. FvD then left the European Conservatives and Reformists Party. The party was affiliated with the Identity and Democracy (ID) far-right political group of the European Parliament for a short period in 2022, leaving in October after accusing ID of being anti-Russian. As of 2022 the party's current MEP sits as a Non-Inscrit.

Economy 
FvD in the economic field supports economic liberalism. The party is a proponent of the introduction of a high tax-free bracket for everyone, the abolition of taxes on gifts and inheritance and a radical simplification of tax brackets. The party is a proponent of drastic changes in elementary and secondary education, focusing on performance evaluations for teachers. It wants to expand the armed forces, expanding the National Reserve Corps and reverting defense budget cuts.

Electoral reform 
One of the major issues Forum for Democracy campaigns against is the perceived existence of a "party cartel" in which the main ruling parties of the country divide power among themselves and work towards the same goals despite claiming to be competitors. The party promises direct democracy through binding referendums as well as directly elected mayors and a directly elected Prime Minister. The party is also in favor of the government consisting of apolitical experts in their respective fields ("technocracy"), and top civil servants having to reapply for their positions whenever a new cabinet is formed.

Immigration and European Union 
The party states that it supports protecting European civilization and wants free trade between European nations and the world but is opposed to the European Union (EU) and the Eurozone. The party calls for an immediate end to EU enlargement and for the Netherlands to use every veto possible to prevent the EU from becoming a federal superstate. It also supports referendums and Dutch withdrawal from the Eurozone and the Schengen Agreement. FvD also wants a renegotiation of Dutch membership of the EU followed by a binding referendum on EU membership and an "intelligent exit" (Nexit) from the EU if it cannot be reformed and terms cannot be met.

The FvD also adopts a nationalist viewpoint in which the Dutch culture should be protected. The party is in favor of reinstating border controls and ending what it perceives as mass immigration. It also campaigns against unchecked immigration, says it would introduce a Dutch Values Protection Act. The party supports freedom of religion and calls for equal treatment of all citizens regardless of gender, race or sexual orientation, but is also against any further influence of Islamic culture on Dutch society, supports a crackdown on forced or child marriages and wants to ban Islamic face veils and other face coverings. The FvD also opposes foreign funding of Islamic schools and institutions, and argues that all schools in the Netherlands should subscribe to "Judeo-Christian values." FvD also states that immigrants who do not wish to integrate should be offered incentives to return to their native country and that whenever possible asylum seekers should be processed off Dutch soil.

Foreign policy 
The FvD blames the NATO countries for the escalation of the 2022 Russian invasion of Ukraine and openly supports the Russian view of the conflict. The party's original co-founder Henk Otten has criticised the FvD's stance on Russia and called Baudet a "Manchurian candidate" of Putin.

Criminal justice 
The party calls for a reform of the Dutch justice system, increased funding for the Dutch police force, tougher penalties against those convicted of violent crimes and where possible for non-naturalized immigrants found guilty of serious crimes to be deported and tried in their country of origin.

Environmental and social policies 
FvD calls for a gradual legalization of soft drugs but also supports reducing the number of cannabis coffee shops within the vicinity of schools. The party also calls for a reduction in the use of plastic, more support for the agricultural economy, sustainable farming and tougher laws against animal cruelty. In the spring of 2019, the party, endorsing a climate change denialist platform, intensively campaigned against large state investments in renewable energy, leading to a victory in the provincial elections. Later that year, it also supported protests by Dutch farmers against enforcing legislation on nitrogen emissions.

Society and culture 
FvD supports high culture. It argues for the protection of Dutch culture and "European classical music, art and knowledge." It is critical of modern architecture, calling for both new government buildings to be constructed in a neoclassical style and for city planning that "fits within a historical view." FvD also supports the establishment of a commission to protect historic monuments from destruction, wants Frysk to be retained as a second state language, calls for schools to teach about "beautiful things that the West has produced" and supports free museum admission for all Dutch citizens. However, the party has also promoted plans to defund and privatize the Nederlandse Publieke Omroep, a Dutch public broadcasting organization.

Controversies 
Since it became active in politics, FvD has sparked controversy, especially regarding allegations of racism against important FvD politicians, the FvD "left-wing indoctrination in education" hotline and initially whether the FvD is a far-right formerly refused by the party. Many of these controversies surround party leader Baudet.

In April 2020, HP/De Tijd revealed instances of antisemitism, homophobia and glorification of Anders Breivik and Brenton Tarrant in online WhatsApp groups associated with FvD's youth wing. FvD later investigated these instances and discharged three members from the political party. Three additional members were also suspended. More similar messages were revealed in November by newspaper Het Parool which published an article about extremist comments made by members the party's youth organization.

In response, a committee of inquiry was set up with some FvD politicians such as Theo Hiddema arguing that the youth wing should be disbanded and others stating the FvD should follow the example of the Sweden Democrats by disassociating the youth-wing. 
Baudet also resigned as lead candidate and was temporarily replaced by Lennart van der Linden. The day after Baudet resigned as leader, vice-leader Theo Hiddema vacated his seat in the Tweede Kamer for "personal reasons," although some media outlets opined that it was due to controversies within the party. The following day, Senator Paul Cliteur also resigned from his position as Senate leader while remaining a member of the party. On 26 November 2020, FvD Senator Nicki Pouw-Verweij released a letter alleging multiple incidents during a dinner on 20 November, including Baudet making antisemitic statements claiming that the COVID-19 lockdowns were concocted by George Soros and lashing out at colleague Joost Eerdmans. Baudet denied the accusations.

In December 2020, Baudet reversed his actions and announced the party would hold a leadership contest. The FvD's board announced an internal referendum on whether to expel Baudet from the party and replace him with a new leader. This took place on 3 December 2020, with 76% of FvD members voting in favour of Baudet remaining in the party and he subsequently resumed his role as leader. In protest at the outcome, the FvD's three MEPs, seven of its senators and some of its parliamentary candidates for the upcoming general election resigned to sit as independents before joining the JA21 party founded by former FvD members who had left due to the youth wing controversies.

Split-off parties 
In August 2019, former FvD senator and founding member Henk Otten announced he had registered Group Otten (GO) as a new political party. GO currently has two seats in the Senate and one seat in the European Parliament which were taken up by former FvD members.

On 18 December 2020, former FvD parliamentary candidates Joost Eerdmans and Annabel Nanninga created JA21 to contest in the 2021 Dutch general election following what they felt was the FvD's poor handling of members of the youth wing who had made extremist statements and controversies related to Baudet. They were joined by the FvD's three MEPs and seven senators.

Following the 2021 Dutch election, FvD MP Wybren van Haga founded Belang van Nederland and was joined by two former FvD MPs.

Representation

Members of the House of Representatives

Members of the Senate 
 Johan Dessing

Members of the European Parliament 
 Marcel de Graaff (defected from Party for Freedom in January 2022)

Electoral results

House of Representatives

Senate

Municipal

Provincial

European Parliament

Party membership 

Prior to 2022, party membership numbers of FvD were not independently verified and have been disputed.

Organization

Leadership 
 Leaders
 Thierry Baudet (22 September 2016 – present)
 Chairman
 Thierry Baudet (22 September 2016 – 17 January 2017; 25 November 2017 – present)
 Paul Frentrop (interim; 17 January 2017 – 24 November 2017)
 Leaders in the House of Representatives
 Thierry Baudet (23 March 2017 – present)
 Lijsttrekker for the general election
 Thierry Baudet (2017, 2021)

References

External links 

 
Documentation Centre Dutch Political Parties about FvD (in Dutch)

2016 establishments in the Netherlands
Political parties established in 2016
Conservative parties in the Netherlands
Nationalist parties in the Netherlands
Environmental skepticism
Eurosceptic parties in the Netherlands
Direct democracy parties
National conservative parties
Election and voting-related organizations
Organisations based in Amsterdam
Right-wing populist parties
Right-wing populism in the Netherlands
Far-right parties in Europe